Den opvakte jomfru is a 1950 Danish family film directed by Lau Lauritzen Jr. and Alice O'Fredericks.

Cast
Marguerite Viby as Skønjomfruen Anne Pedersdatter
Helge Kjærulff-Schmidt as Profossor Ebenezer Steenhammer
Lisbeth Movin as Frk. Grøndal
Kjeld Jacobsen as Journalist
Kjeld Petersen as Pressefotograf
Sigurd Langberg as Profossor A.P. Jørgensen
Elith Pio as Chefredaktør
Knud Schrøder as Redaktionssekretær
Minna Jørgensen as Steenhammers husbestyreinde
Ib Schønberg as Abbeden

External links

1950 films
1950s Danish-language films
Danish black-and-white films
Films directed by Lau Lauritzen Jr.
Films directed by Alice O'Fredericks
Films scored by Sven Gyldmark